The PATH400 Greenway Trail is a multi-use trail under construction along the Georgia 400 freeway in Buckhead, Atlanta. Once complete, the trail will be 10 feet (3.0 m) to 14 feet (4.3 m) wide and traverse the cities of Atlanta, Sandy Springs and Dunwoody.

Trail
PATH400 will be ca.  long, extending from Loridans Drive south to the Atlanta BeltLine’s Peachtree Creek spur trail. It is intended to be the "spine of Buckhead’s Trails and Greenways Subsystem, part of the Buckhead Collection, connecting parks, trails, schools and neighborhoods to the urban core of Buckhead and ultimately to the Atlanta BeltLine." The PATH400 Trail is a partnership between Buckhead CID, Livable Buckhead and the PATH Foundation, and is estimated to cost $10 million. City and Federal funding of $12.66 million was approved at the end of 2017.

Future expansion

Dunwoody
Additional plans include connecting Dunwoody to the multi-use trail.

Roswell
Roswell is working with Sandy Springs to jointly submit packages of support to GDOT, according to a staff memo to the council. The city of Roswell has been considering expanding the trail northward to Roswell.

Sandy Springs
On October 25th, 2017 consultants presented early plans for an extension of the PATH400 to the city of Sandy Springs.

Art
Colorful crosswalks and Star Wars themed chalk art have been displayed on the greenway.

See also
10-Minute Walk
Cycling infrastructure
PATH Foundation
Smart Growth
Walkability

References

External links
Path 400 Greenway website

Hiking trails in Atlanta
Bike paths in Georgia (U.S. state)
Urban planning in Georgia (U.S. state)
Transportation in Atlanta
Transportation in Fulton County, Georgia